Tadhg mac Murchadh Ó Briain (anglicised Teige Mac Murrough O’Brien), died 1577, was an Irish soldier and official who served as the first sheriff of Thomond between 1570 and 1571.

Ó Briain played an active political and military role during the Tudor reconquest of Ireland. He was a son of Murrough O'Brien, 1st Earl of Thomond and Eleanor fitz John. Ó Briain had four children:
 Honora Ní Briain
 Toirdhealbhach Ó Briain
 Slany Ní Brien
 Amy Ní Brien

References

1577 deaths
Teige
High Sheriffs of Clare
16th-century Irish people
People from County Clare
People of Elizabethan Ireland
Younger sons of earls